Season 1878–79 was the fourth season in which Heart of Midlothian competed at a Scottish national level, entering the Scottish Cup for the fourth time.

Overview 
Hearts reached the fourth round of the Scottish Cup, losing 2–1 to Helensburgh.

Hearts also reached the final of the Edinburgh FA Cup losing 2–0 to Hibs after a replay.

Results

Scottish cup

Edinburgh FA Cup

See also
List of Heart of Midlothian F.C. seasons

References 

 Statistical Record 78-79

External links 
 Official Club website

Heart of Midlothian F.C. seasons
Hea